Can't Get Enough may refer to:

Albums 
 Can't Get Enough (Barry White album), 1974
 Can't Get Enough (Eagle-Eye Cherry album), 2012
 Can't Get Enough (Eddy Grant album), 1981
 Can't Get Enough (Menudo album), 1986
 Can't Get Enough (Tommy Emmanuel album), 1996
 Can't Get Enough (The Rides album), 2013
 Can't Get Enough, an album by StoneBridge, 2004

Songs 
 "Can't Get Enough" (Bad Company song), 1974
 "Can't Get Enough" (Becky G song), 2013
 "Can't Get Enough" (J. Cole song), 2011
 "Can't Get Enough" (Patty Loveless song), 1999
 "Can't Get Enough" (Suede song), 1999
 "Can't Get Enough" (Supergroove song), 1994
 "Can't Get Enough" (Tamia song), 2006
 "Can't Get Enough (Of Your Love)", a song by Kim Wilde, 1990
 "Can't Get Enough", a song by Brutha
 "Can't Get Enough", a song by Claudette Ortiz
 "Can't Get Enough", a song by Justin Timberlake written for the National Basketball Association
 "Can't Get Enough", a song by Kovas
 "Can't Get Enough", a song by Soulsearcher
 "Can't Get Enough", a song by Becky G featuring Pitbull

See also
 "Can't Get Enuff", a song by Winger
 "Can't Get Enough of You Baby", a song by the Four Seasons 
 "Can't Get Enough of Your Love, Babe", a song by Barry White
 "I Can't Get Enough", a song by Benny Blanco, Tainy, Selena Gomez and J Balvin
 "Just Can't Get Enough" a song by Depeche Mode